Egon Schmidt  (16 June 1931 – 31 January 2023) was a Hungarian ornithologist and natural historian.

Life and career 
Born in Budapest, Schmidt spent his childhood in Becsehely, and after his studies, he worked at the Budapest Zoo and Botanical Garden, and later at the Hungarian Institute of Ornithology. He authored nearly 100 books and over 3,500 popular science articles. The main objects of his studies were the thrushes and the feeding of the owl species. He hosted a radio program about birds on Magyar Rádió for 17 years. 

A founding member of the Hungarian Ornithological and Nature Conservation Society, during his career he received numerous honours and accolades, including a Pro Natura honorary plaque, the Kossuth Prize and the Ferencváros Award for Environmental Protection and Nature Conservation, which after his 2015 win was renamed in 2016 Egon Schmidt Award of Ferencváros. He died on 31 January 2023, at the age of 91.

References

External links 
 
 Egon Schmidt at Moly.hu 

1931 births
2023 deaths 
People from Budapest
Hungarian ornithologists
Science communicators
Recipients of the Kossuth Prize
Hungarian environmentalists